Blacher is a surname. Notable people with the surname include:

Boris Blacher (1903–1975), German composer
 Borislav Blacher, birth name of Boryslav Bereza, Ukrainian politician
Kolja Blacher (born 1963), German violinist, son of Boris Blacher
Sarah Blacher Cohen (1936–2008), writer and scholar
Tatjana Blacher (born 1956), German actress; daughter of Boris Blacher

See also
Blücher (surname)

German-language surnames

de:Blacher